Golab Rural District is a rural district (dehestan) in Barzok District, Kashan County, Isfahan Province, Iran. At the 2006 census, its population was 5,152, in 1,533 families.  The rural district has 8 villages.

References 

Rural Districts of Isfahan Province
Kashan County